Celeste Carballo (born September 21, 1956, Buenos Aires, Argentina) is an Argentine singer-songwriter in rock, blues, hard rock, punk and tango. She became known in the early 1980s for her distinctive voice range from B2 to F#6 in head voice. Her highest note in chest voice is B5. This way, her voice covers 3.7 octaves.

In the late 1980s, she made public her homosexuality and publicly confessed her romance with fellow singer Sandra Mihanovich. Although her confession was unprecedented in the memory of a still fairly inexperienced in basic issues country, this did not affect her career.

In 2010, she begins the elaboration of what will become in autumn 2011 her next studio album. "Mujer de piedra", a rock and blues album with ten new songs that the composer has been writing throughout these years of silence since her last album of unpublished songs (Tercer infinito, 1998). The album will be presented at the ND Ateneo theater on May 14, whose first promotional single is "Cruz del sur" chosen by Mega 98.3 in support of Mujer de piedra; while the singer has chosen the reggae "Quema tóxica" to film the video clip to add meaning to the cause and raise awareness of the fumes generated by burning garbage. 

Among her best known songs are "¿Seré judía?", "Me vuelvo cada día más loca", "Es la vida que me alcanza", "Mi último blues", "Mujer contra mujer" and "Una canción diferente". In 2015, she received her fourth Konex Award in her career, defining herself, according to the Konex Foundation, for 4 decades in a row as one of the best female rock soloists in Argentina.

Discography

See also 
LGBT rights in Argentina
Argentine rock
Argentine punk

References 

1956 births
Living people
Argentine guitarists
Argentine women singer-songwriters
20th-century Argentine women singers
21st-century Argentine women singers
Argentine rock musicians
Argentine rock singers
Argentine lesbian musicians
Argentine LGBT singers
Argentine LGBT songwriters
Lesbian singers
Lesbian songwriters
EMI Latin artists
Singers from Buenos Aires
People from Coronel Pringles
20th-century Argentine LGBT people
21st-century Argentine LGBT people
Women in Latin music
LGBT people in Latin music